The 2001–02 FA Cup (known as The FA Cup sponsored by AXA for sponsorship reasons) was the 121st season of the world's oldest knockout football competition, the FA Cup. The competition was won by Arsenal with a 2–0 win against Chelsea, courtesy of goals from Ray Parlour and Freddie Ljungberg in the final 20 minutes of the game, completing a domestic Double for Arsenal.

First round proper

This round is the first in which teams from the Second Division and Third Division compete with non-League teams. Matches were played 16, 17 and 18 November, with replays on 27 November and 28 November.

Second round proper
Matches were played on 8 December and 9 December, with replays on 18 December and 19 December.

Third round proper
This round marked the first time First Division and Premier League (top-flight) teams played. Matches played 5 January and 6 January, replays on 15 January and 16 January.

Fourth round proper
Matches played on the weekend of 26 January, replay on 6 February. The match between Arsenal and Liverpool was a rematch of the previous year's final.

Fifth round proper
Matches played on the weekend of 16 February and 17 February, with the replay on 26 February.

West Bromwich Albion were the only non-Premiership side to progress to the last eight, at the expense of Cheltenham Town – the last remaining Division Three side in the competition.

Sixth round proper
Matches were played on the weekend of 9 March, with the replay on 23 March.

West Bromwich Albion were the last non-Premiership side remaining in the competition, and their hopes of further progression were ended when they lost the quarter-final tie at home to Fulham.

Replay

Semi-finals
Matches played at a neutral venue on April 14, 2002.

Gianluca Festa, who had been on the losing side for Middlesbrough in both the FA Cup and League Cup finals five years earlier, endured further misfortune when he scored an own goal that ended his side's hopes of FA Cup glory and handed the initiative to Arsenal.

Fulham, who were playing their first top division season for more than 30 years, had been hoping to compensate for a disappointing Premier League campaign with glory in the FA Cup. These hopes were ended by their neighbours Chelsea, who won the semi-final tie 1–0.

Final

Arsenal's 2–0 victory set them up for a third double (which was completed when they sealed the league title four days later) and saw them equal Tottenham's eight FA Cup triumphs – putting them second only to Manchester United (10 trophies) as the most frequent winners of the FA Cup.

Media coverage
In the United Kingdom, the BBC were the free to air broadcasters taking over from ITV who had it after four years while Sky Sports were the subscription broadcasters for the fourteenth consecutive season.

The BBC had a much-expanded rights package compared to previous terrestrial networks, showing live games from the first two rounds and multiple live matches from rounds 3 to 6.  This meant two BBC live matches on a Sunday and matches being played at 7pm on a Sunday evening, which was not popular with travelling supporters and was discontinued after the fifth round; the quarter final between Newcastle and Arsenal was the first FA Cup match other than finals to be shown live by the BBC on a Saturday.

The live matches shown on the BBC were: Hereford United 1–0 Wrexham (R1); Canvey Island 1–0 Northampton Town (R2); Macclesfield Town 0–3 West Ham United and Aston Villa 2–3 Manchester United (R3); Arsenal 1–0 Liverpool and Ipswich Town 1–4 Manchester City (R4); Everton 0–0 Crewe Alexandra and Newcastle United 1–0 Manchester City (R5); Newcastle United 1–1 Arsenal and Middlesbrough 3–0 Everton (QF); Fulham 0–1 Chelsea (SF); and Arsenal 2–0 Chelsea (Final).

References

 
FA Cup seasons
Fa Cup, 2001-02
Fa Cup, 2001-02